Terry Monaghan (born 26 August 1933) is a British speed skater. He competed in four events at the 1960 Winter Olympics.

References

1933 births
Living people
British male speed skaters
Olympic speed skaters of Great Britain
Speed skaters at the 1960 Winter Olympics
People from Mountain Ash, Wales
Sportspeople from Rhondda Cynon Taf